Iwamura (written: 岩村 lit. "rock village") is a Japanese surname. Notable people with the surname include:

Akinori Iwamura, Japanese baseball player
Noboru Iwamura, Japanese biologist
Ai Iwamura, Japanese actress
Iwamura Michitoshi, Meiji era politician
, Japanese sprint canoeist

See also 
Iwamura Castle in Gifu Prefecture, Japan
Iwamura, Gifu, former town in Gifu Prefecture, Japan
67853 Iwamura, main-belt asteroid

Japanese-language surnames